Rabah Deghmani (born 10 May 1975 in Rouïba, Algiers Province), is an Algerian footballer, who currently plays for WR Bentalha in the Algerian league.

Deghmani made several appearances for the Algeria national football team during 2001.

Honours
Won the Algerian league three times in 2002, 2003 and 2005 with USM Alger
Runner up in the Algerian league three times in 1998, 2001 and 2004 with USM Alger
Won the Algerian Cup five times in 1997, 1998, 2001, 2003 and 2004 with USM Alger

References

External links
 DZFoot.com Profile

1975 births
Living people
People from Rouïba
Algerian footballers
Algeria international footballers
USM Alger players
OMR El Annasser players
WR Bentalha players
IB Khémis El Khechna players
Association football midfielders
21st-century Algerian people